"The Wise" is an epithet which may refer to:

People
 Ailerán (died 664 or 665), Irish saint and scholar
 Alfonso X of Castile (1221–1284), King of Castile, León and Galicia
 Ari Thorgilsson, (1067–1148), Icelandic medieval chronicler
 Banban the Wise, Irish saint, fl. c. mid to late 5th century
 Berengar the Wise (died 835), Count (or Duke) of Toulouse, Duke (or Margrave) of Septimania, and Count of Barcelona
 Cato the Elder (234–149 BC), Roman soldier, senator and historian
 Charles V of France (1338–1380), King of France
 Epiphanius the Wise (died 1420), monk and Eastern Orthodox saint
 Francisco José de Caldas (1768–1816), Colombian lawyer, engineer and geographer
 Frederick III, Elector of Saxony (1463–1525), a German nobleman who protected Martin Luther
 Gildas (c. 500–570), British saint and cleric
 John V, Duke of Brittany (1389–1442), also Count of Montfort
 Leo VI the Wise (866-912), Eastern Roman Emperor, Macedonian dynasty
 Louis I of Brzeg (c. 1321-1398), Duke and regent of Legnica, Duke of Brzeg
 Robert, King of Naples (1277-1343), known as a peacemaker and a patron of the arts
 Rognvald Eysteinsson (fl. 9th century), founder of the Earldom of Orkney in the Norse Sagas
 Yaroslav the Wise (c. 978–1054), thrice Grand Prince of Novgorod and Kiev

Fictional and mythological characters 
 Dag the Wise, mythological Swedish king
 Alhamazad the Wise, see List of Greyhawk characters
 Ansem the Wise, one the characters of Kingdom Hearts
 Darth Plagueis the Wise, mentioned in Star Wars Episode III: Revenge of the Sith
 the title character of the play Nathan the Wise
 Russano the Wise, from several Redwall novels
 Vasilisa the Wise, variant name in The Frog Princess

See also
 List of people known as the Learned

Lists of people by epithet